Carlos Davis may refer to:

Carlos Davis (screenwriter) (born 1948), American screenwriter
Carlos Davis (American football) (born 1996), American football defensive lineman